Michael Robert Polley  (born 4 November 1949 in Westbury, Tasmania) is a Labor Party politician and former member of the Tasmanian House of Assembly in the Division of Lyons. First elected in 1972 at age 22 he was the longest-serving member of the Tasmanian parliament, having been re-elected at ten successive State elections. He is married with two sons and one daughter.

He was the youngest Cabinet Minister in Tasmanian history, appointed at the age of 27 in the government of premier Doug Lowe.  His wife Kim Polley is Mayor of Northern Midlands Council, on which his son Tim also serves.  His sister Helen Polley is a member of the Australian Senate.

In 1989 during the Field government he was made the speaker of the Tasmanian House of Assembly. He became speaker again in 1998 when Labor won government. He was minister for national parks 1976–1981.

In the Tasmanian state election 2006, Polley received the highest primary vote in Lyons.

Polley announced in June 2013 that he would retire at the 2014 Tasmanian state election.

In September 2014 Polley announced he would stand as councillor for the Northern Midlands Council in the 2014 Tasmanian Local Government Elections.

External links
 

1949 births
Living people
Members of the Tasmanian House of Assembly
Speakers of the Tasmanian House of Assembly
Members of the Order of Australia
People from Westbury, Tasmania
Australian Labor Party members of the Parliament of Tasmania
21st-century Australian politicians